Derindere is a village in the Pülümür District, Tunceli Province, Turkey. The village is populated by Kurds and had a population of 58 in 2021.

The hamlets of Erdem, Yeniköy and Yukarıderindere are attached to the village.

References 

Kurdish settlements in Tunceli Province
Villages in Pülümür District